ZF, Z-F, or Zf may refer to:

Businesses and organizations
 ZF Friedrichshafen, a German supplier of automobile transmissions
 Zionist Federation of Great Britain and Ireland, an organization established to campaign for a permanent homeland for the Jewish people

Science and technology
 Laminas, a web framework implemented with PHP that was formerly known as Zend Framework
 Zermelo–Fraenkel set theory, a system of axioms in mathematical set theory
 Zinc finger, a protein domain that interacts with zinc ion to bind to DNA 
 Zona fasciculata, the middle zone of the adrenal cortex

Other uses
 Zelda Fitzgerald, wife of F. Scott Fitzgerald
 Z Fighters, the protagonists of the Dragon Ball saga